Elisa Georgiou  is a Cypriot/Australian  model and beauty pageant titleholder who was crowned Miss Cyprus 2013.

Pageantry

Star Cyprus 2013
Elisa won the title of Star Cyprus 2013 and she also won the title of Miss Fantastic in 2013. She is preparing to compete at Miss Universe 2014. The Runners-up were getting the title as Miss Cyprus, Miss Carlsberg and Miss Mediterranean and also will represent Cyprus at International Pageants.

References

Living people
1994 births